Fusiturricula acra is a species of sea snail, a marine gastropod mollusk in the family Drilliidae.

Description
The size of an adult shell varies between 30 mm and 45 mm.

Distribution
This marine species occurs off Colombia and Venezuela.

Fossils have been found in the Gatun formation, Panama.

References

 Woodring, Wendell Phillips. Geology and paleontology of Canal Zone and adjoining parts of Panama; description of Tertiary mollusks (Gastropods: Eulimidae, Marginellidae to Helminthoglyptidae). No. 306-D. 1970.

External links

acra
Gastropods described in 1970
Extinct gastropods